Myrer is a surname. Notable people with the surname include:

Anton Myrer (1922–1996), United States Marine Corps veteran and novelist
Patricia Schartle Myrer (1923–2010), American editor, literary agent, and publishing executive, wife of Anton

See also
Myer (name)